This is a list of flag bearers who have represented São Tomé and Príncipe at the Olympics.

Flag bearers carry the national flag of their country at the opening ceremony of the Olympic Games.

See also
São Tomé and Príncipe at the Olympics

References

São Tomé and Príncipe at the Olympics
Sao Tome
Olympic flagbearers
Olympic flagbearers